Quintin is a commune in the Cotes-d'Armor department (Brittany region) in the northwest of France  from Saint-Brieuc, the department capital.

History
The area around Quintin has been occupied since the Neolithic. Early Quintin was originally located near Vieux-Bourg but, following a plague epidemic, the city moved to its current location. Quintin in Roman times was located on a crossroads but significantly developed in the seventeenth and eighteenth centuries, due to the weaving industry and the trade of linen cloth, but the decline came with the French Revolution and cotton gradually taking the lead over linen. At the height Quintin had 300 weavers. 
Quintin was also a monastic center. But despite its monuments and mansions that one can still see the city, it no longer has the importance it once had. The French Revolution and the wars of religion have  left the fabric of the ancient and medieval city devastated.
In 1843, the geographical and historical dictionary of the province of Brittany, by Jean Ogée explains that the denizens of Quintin speak French and Breton.

Population
 

Inhabitants of Quintin are called  in French.

Mayor
1929 1940 Alfred Duault 
March 2001 2008 Claude Morin    
March 2008 March 2014 Yves Briens   
from March 2014 Mireille Airault

See also
Communes of the Côtes-d'Armor department
Élie Le Goff. Sculptor of Quintin war memorial

References

External links

 

Communes of Côtes-d'Armor
Communes